Ellinor Südow (born 27 June 1998) is a Swedish professional golfer who plays on the LPGA Tour.

Early life and amateur career
Südow grew up in the fishing hamlet Lerberget in Höganäs Municipality. A niece of former LPGA Tour player Mikaela Parmlid, she did not take up golf until age 12, having previously focused on gymnastics. She joined Vasatorp Golf Club and competed nationally in both golf and badminton during high school.

In 2013 she won a title on the Skandia Tour, and in 2016 she clamed a title in the Junior Masters Invitational series.

Südow played college golf at University of North Carolina at Charlotte, joining the year women's golf was added to the Charlotte sports lineup, the 2017–18 school year. She helped Charlotte win their first ever team title with a tie for fourth at the Yale Invitational going 74-73-68 to earn her Conference USA Player of the Week.

In 2019, she experienced the 2019 University of North Carolina at Charlotte shooting and hid in a library on campus during the incident.

Südow joined the University of Arizona in 2021 and pursued a master's degree in business while training with the Arizona Wildcats women's golf team.

In 2021, Südow finished solo second at the Danish International Ladies Amateur Championship and solo third at the German International Amateur. She finished solo third in the 2022 Helen Holm Scottish Women's Open Championship.

Professional career
Südow turned professional in 2022 and played on the LET Access Series, where she held the lead at the Västerås Ladies Open after an opening round of 69, and was a quarter finalist at the Big Green Egg Swedish Matchplay Championship.

She finished tied 17th at LPGA Tour Q-School to earn an LPGA Tour card for 2023. 

She is part of the Swedish Golf Federation squad ahead of the 2024 Summer Olympics.

Amateur wins
2013 Skandia Tour Skåne #4
2016 Innersvingen Junior Open

Sources:

References

External links

Swedish female golfers
LPGA Tour golfers
Arizona Wildcats women's golfers
Charlotte 49ers women's golfers
Sportspeople from Helsingborg
People from Höganäs Municipality
1998 births
Living people